Bennett Sekonyela (born 11 October 1982) is a South African cricketer. He played in seventeen first-class and seventeen List A matches from 2002 to 2007.

References

External links
 

1982 births
Living people
South African cricketers
Border cricketers
Free State cricketers
Griqualand West cricketers
Cricketers from Kimberley, Northern Cape